Grrl Power, known in Japan as  is an independent produced original video animation by Akitaro Daichi. The anime short film was released simultaneously in Japan and North America on June 10, 2004. It was licensed by ADV Films.

Plot 
Sora, Umi and Ao are three school-aged girls who will tackle any job: delivering lunches, to doing your homework and cleaning smokestacks, in order to amass enough money to buy a nearby island and make their own country. However, they have encountered their biggest challenge yet: to convince a boy, Rikku, to go back to school when they themselves do not go.

Characters 
 Sora is the de facto the leader of the group. She is the most energetic. 
 Umi is child very much like a business woman. Specializing in beauty and planning, she believes money can solve everything. 
 Ao is confident in reaching the ultimate goal of buying the island. She is cutely hilarious and intelligent despite her impaired hearing. She communicates using sign language, which is authentically recreated in the anime. 
 Riku is a student who refuses to go to school. He seems somewhat pompous, and is quite ignorant.

Reception 
The series received an Excellence Award for animation at the 2004 Japan Media Arts Festival.

References

External links 
 
 

2004 anime OVAs
ADV Films
Japanese animated short films
Anime with original screenplays
Comedy anime and manga
2004 films